West Whittier-Los Nietos is a census-designated place (CDP) in Los Angeles County, California, near the San Gabriel River and the San Gabriel River (I-605) Freeway.  The population was 25,540 at the 2010 census, up from 25,129 at the 2000 census. The census area consists of separate unincorporated communities of Los Nietos (Spanish for "the grandchildren") and West Whittier.

Geography
West Whittier-Los Nietos is located at  (33.976113, -118.069000), or about three miles (5 km) northwest of Whittier.

Demographics

2010
At the 2010 census West Whittier-Los Nietos had a population of 25,540. The racial makeup of West Whittier-Los Nietos was 15,170 (59.4%) White (9.3% Non-Hispanic White), 254 (1.0%) African American, 372 (1.5%) Native American, 393 (1.5%) Asian, 43 (0.2%) Pacific Islander, 8,404 (32.9%) from other races, and 904 (3.5%) from two or more races. Hispanic or Latino of any race were 22,369 persons (87.6%).

The census reported that 25,446 people (99.6% of the population) lived in households, 44 (0.2%) lived in non-institutionalized group quarters, and 50 (0.2%) were institutionalized.

There were 6,698 households, 3,282 (49.0%) had children under the age of 18 living in them, 3,684 (55.0%) were opposite-sex married couples living together, 1,319 (19.7%) had a female householder with no husband present, 598 (8.9%) had a male householder with no wife present.  There were 427 (6.4%) unmarried opposite-sex partnerships, and 49 (0.7%) same-sex married couples or partnerships. 843 households (12.6%) were one person and 466 (7.0%) had someone living alone who was 65 or older. The average household size was 3.80.  There were 5,601 families (83.6% of households); the average family size was 4.07.

The age distribution was 6,901 people (27.0%) under the age of 18, 2,742 people (10.7%) aged 18 to 24, 7,220 people (28.3%) aged 25 to 44, 5,825 people (22.8%) aged 45 to 64, and 2,852 people (11.2%) who were 65 or older.  The median age was 33.7 years. For every 100 females, there were 97.0 males.  For every 100 females age 18 and over, there were 93.5 males.

There were 6,923 housing units at an average density of 2,748.2 per square mile, of the occupied units 4,897 (73.1%) were owner-occupied and 1,801 (26.9%) were rented. The homeowner vacancy rate was 1.0%; the rental vacancy rate was 5.5%.  18,510 people (72.5% of the population) lived in owner-occupied housing units and 6,936 people (27.2%) lived in rental housing units.

According to the 2010 United States Census, West Whittier-Los Nietos had a median household income of $60,525, with 9.4% of the population living below the federal poverty line.

2000
At the 2000 census there were 25,129 people, 6,720 households, and 5,597 families in the CDP. The population density was 9,997.3 inhabitants per square mile (3,865.5/km). The racial makeup of the CDP was 53.06% White, 0.57% African American, 1.25% Native American, 1.63% Asian, 0.20% Pacific Islander, 38.49% from other races, and 4.79% from two or more races. Hispanic or Latino of any race were 83.07%.

Of the 6,720 households 43.5% had children under the age of 18 living with them, 59.7% were married couples living together, 16.3% had a female householder with no husband present, and 16.7% were non-families. 13.5% of households were one person and 6.9% were one person aged 65 or older.  The average household size was 3.73 and the average family size was 4.04.

The age distribution was 30.9% under the age of 18, 10.8% from 18 to 24, 29.7% from 25 to 44, 18.2% from 45 to 64, and 10.4% 65 or older.  The median age was 30 years. For every 100 females, there were 96.2 males.  For every 100 females age 18 and over, there were 91.7 males.

The median household income was $45,921 and the median family income  was $47,699. Males had a median income of $33,012 versus $26,057 for females. The per capita income for the CDP was $14,417.  About 6.3% of families and 8.9% of the population were below the poverty line, including 9.2% of those under age 18 and 6.8% of those age 65 or over.

History

Los Nietos is among the oldest communities in Southern California.  The Los Nietos School District was established in 1861 and a Methodist circuit centered on the city was founded in 1867.

The community grew up around the Rancho Los Nietos and its constituent rancho Rancho Santa Gertrudes.  Los Nietos was listed as a township in the 1860 and 1870 census, with its area comprising most of the old Rancho Los Nietos, thereby stretching from the Puente Hills south to Long Beach.  Census records report a population of 605 in 1860 and 1,544 in 1870.

From the 1950s to the 1980s the community was served by the Whittier Downs Shopping Center.

Education
The area is served by the Whittier Union High School District, primarily Pioneer High.  For elementary school, the area is served by the Los Nietos School District and the Whittier City School District.  Two middle schools are in the area (Katherine Edwards and Los Nietos) as are several elementary schools (Aeolian, Nelson, Phelan, Sorensen and West Whittier)

Politics
In the state legislature West Whittier-Los Nietos is located in the 30th Senate District, represented by Democrat Bob Archuleta, and in the 57th Assembly District, represented by Democrat Lisa Calderon. Federally, West Whittier-Los Nietos is located in California's 38th congressional district, which is represented by Democrat Linda Sánchez.

The Los Angeles County Sheriff's Department operates the Pico Rivera Station in Pico Rivera, serving West Whittier.

See also

References

Census-designated places in Los Angeles County, California
Census-designated places in California